Professor Maneesha Inamdar is a stem cell and developmental biologist conducting research at Bangalore, India. She is presently Director of inStem (Institute for Stem Cell Science and Regenerative Medicine), India’s first stem cell institute. She is on deputation from the Jawaharlal Nehru Centre for Advanced Scientific Research (JNCASR), Bangalore. She is an elected fellow of the Indian Academy of Sciences and the Indian National Science Academy and a J C Bose National Fellow.

Biography 

Dr. Inamdar did her Ph.D. at the Tata Institute of Fundamental Research, Mumbai and postdoctoral research at the University of North Carolina, Chapel Hill, USA. She has formerly held the positions of Professor and Chairperson (Molecular Biology and Genetics Unit), JNCASR; Dean (Fellowships and Extension Programmes), JNCASR; Adjunct Professor, inStem and Visiting Professor, Tata Institute for Genetics and Society Centre at inStem. She is a fellow of the Indian Academy of Science and the Indian National Science Academy.

Research 

Inamdar's group works on the basic biology of stem cells.

The group led by her has developed normal stem cell lines from defective embryos and these have been deposited at the UK Stem Cell Bank. Their efforts have been included in the International Stem Cell Forum (ISCI2) initiatives and they represent the sole contribution of India in these initiatives. Inamdar is also working on the development of regenerative therapeutic methods by collecting patient-derived induced pluripotent stem cells (iPS) for which they have generated mouse and human induced iPS cells. Her studies have been documented by way of a number of articles and resource materials.

Professional activities 
Inamdar has carried out projects for the Department of Biotechnology, the Department of Science and Technology, the Council of Scientific and Industrial Research and other international agencies including the UK-India Education and Research Initiative (UKIERI), Indo-US Science and Technology Forum (IUSSTF), The Wellcome Trust, UK, the DBT-Indo-Danish programme and the Indo-French Centre for the Promotion of Advanced Research (IFCPAR/CEFIPRA).

She is a member or life member of the Indian Society of Cell Biology, the Society for Developmental Biology, USA, the International Society for Stem Cell Research (ISSCR), the North American Vascular Biology Organization (NAVBO) and the Indian Society of Developmental Biologists.

She represents India in the International Stem Cell Initiative (ISCI) and the International Stem Cell Banking Initiative (ISCBI) where she is also a member of the steering group. She also serves as an expert and advisor in various capacities in several national and international committees including hESC Registry Europe, International Stem Cell Registry, Europe. She is Chairperson or a member of several national and institutional advisory and review committees for ethics and stem cell research.
Inamdar is a member of the Global Forum on Bioethics in Research (GFBR) planning committee (2019) and the World Health Organization (WHO) expert advisory committee to examine the scientific, ethical, social and legal challenges associated with Human Genome editing.

Honors 
Inamdar was selected as a Young Associate of the Indian Academy of Sciences in 1999. The Department of Biotechnology (DBT) of the Government of India awarded her the National Bioscience Award for Career Development, . She was awarded the National Women Bioscientist Award, in 2011. The Indian Academy of Sciences honoured her with elected fellowship in 2017. She was also elected Fellow of the Indian National Science Academy in 2018. She was awarded the Dr Kalpana Chawla Award for 2017 and the Prof. C.N.R. Rao Oration Award and the J C Bose National Fellowship in 2019.

Selected bibliography 
 Sinha, Saloni; Dwivedi, Tirath R; Yengkhom, Roja; Bheemsetty, Venkata A; Abe, Takaya; Kiyonari, Hiroshi; VijayRaghavan K and Inamdar, Maneesha S. "Asrij/OCIAD1 suppresses CSN5-mediated p53 degradation and maintains mouse hematopoietic stem cell quiescence." Blood. doi:10.1182/blood.2019000530.
Sinha, Saloni; Ray, Arindam; Abhilash, Lakshman; Kumar, Manish; Sreenivasamurthy, Sreelakshmi K; Keshava Prasad TS; Inamdar Maneesha S. "Proteomics of Asrij perturbation in Drosophila lymph glands for identification of new regulators of hematopoiesis." Molecular and Cellular Proteomics. doi:10.1074/mcp.RA119.001299.
Joshi, Divyesh and Inamdar, Maneesha S. "Rudhira/BCAS3 couples microtubules and intermediate 1 filaments to promote cell migration for angiogenic remodeling." Molecular Biology of the Cell. doi:10.1091/mbc.E18-08-0484.
Shetty, Deeti K.; Kalamkar, Kaustubh P.; Inamdar, Maneesha S. (2018-07). "OCIAD1 Controls Electron Transport Chain Complex I Activity to Regulate Energy Metabolism in Human Pluripotent Stem Cells". Stem Cell Reports. 11 (1): 128–141. doi:10.1016/j.stemcr.2018.05.015. ISSN 2213-6711.
 Sinha, Saloni; Bheemsetty, Venkata Anudeep and Inamdar, Maneesha S. "A double helical motif in OCIAD2 is essential for its localisation, interactions and STAT3 activation. Scientific Reports. doi:10.1038/s41598-018-25667-3.
Shetty, Ronak; Joshi, Divyesh; Jain, Mamta; Vasudevan, Madavan; Paul, Jasper Chrysolite; Bhat, Ganesh; Banerjee, Poulomi; Abe, Takaya; Kiyonari, Hiroshi; VijayRaghavan K and Inamdar Maneesha S (2018-04-04). "Rudhira/BCAS3 is essential for mouse development and cardiovascular patterning".Scientific Reports. 8 (1). doi:10.1038/s41598-018-24014-w. ISSN 2045-2322.  
 Ranganath, Sudhir H.; Tong, Zhixiang; Levy, Oren; Martyn, Keir; Karp, Jeffrey M.; Inamdar, Maneesha S. (2016-06). "Controlled Inhibition of the Mesenchymal Stromal Cell Pro-inflammatory Secretome via Microparticle Engineering". Stem Cell Reports. 6 (6): 926–939. doi:10.1016/j.stemcr.2016.05.003. ISSN 2213-6711.
Shetty, Deeti K.; Inamdar, Maneesha S. (2016-03). "Generation of a heterozygous knockout human embryonic stem cell line for the OCIAD1 locus using CRISPR/CAS9 mediated targeting: BJNhem20-OCIAD1-CRISPR-39". Stem Cell Research. 16 (2): 308–310. doi:10.1016/j.scr.2015.12.037. ISSN 1873-5061.
Khadilkar, Rohan J.; Rodrigues, Diana; Mote, Ridim Dadasaheb; Sinha, Arghyashree Roychowdhury; Kulkarni, Vani; Magadi, Srivathsa Subramanya; Inamdar, Maneesha S. (2014-03-18). "ARF1–GTP regulates Asrij to provide endocytic control of Drosophila blood cell homeostasis". Proceedings of the National Academy of Sciences. 111 (13): 4898–4903. doi:10.1073/pnas.1303559111. ISSN 0027-8424.
Inamdar, Maneesha S.; Healy, Lyn; Sinha, Abhishek; Stacey, Glyn (2011-10-29). "Global Solutions to the Challenges of Setting up and Managing a Stem Cell Laboratory". Stem Cell Reviews and Reports. 8 (3): 830–843. doi:10.1007/s12015-011-9326-7. ISSN 1550-8943.
"Screening ethnically diverse human embryonic stem cells identifies a chromosome 20 minimal amplicon conferring growth advantage". Nature Biotechnology. 29 (12): 1132–1144. 2011-11-27. doi:10.1038/nbt.2051. ISSN 1087-0156.
Inamdar, Maneesha S.; Venu, Parvathy; Srinivas, M.S.; Rao, Kamini; VijayRaghavan, K. (2009-04). "Derivation and Characterization of Two Sibling Human Embryonic Stem Cell Lines From Discarded Grade III Embryos". Stem Cells and Development. 18 (3): 423–434. doi:10.1089/scd.2008.0131. ISSN 1547-3287.

See also 

 ARF1
 Angiogenesis

Notes

References

External links 
 
 

N-BIOS Prize recipients
Indian scientific authors
Living people
Indian medical academics
Indian medical researchers
Scientists from Karnataka
1967 births
Fellows of the Indian Academy of Sciences
Indian cell biologists
Tata Institute of Fundamental Research alumni
University of North Carolina at Chapel Hill alumni
Indian molecular biologists
Stem cell researchers